Svensktoppen is a weekly record chart airing at Sveriges Radio. Until January 2003, the songs had to be in the Swedish language. Svensktoppen has aired since 1962, except for the years 1982-1985. The last years before the January 2003 change, the programme was strongly dominated by dansband music.

The first number one hit song was "Midnattstango" performed by Swedish crooner Lars Lönndahl.

New rules on 17 January 2016, restricted the maximum length for a song to chart to one year.

Presenters
Barbro Lindström (1962–1963)
Carl-Uno Sjöblom (1963)
Magnus Banck (1963)
Torbjörn Johnsson (1964–1965)
Gert Landin (1965)
Bengteric Nordell (1965)
Jörgen Cederberg (1966)
Ulf Elfving (1966–1973)
Kent Finell (1973–1975)
Kersti Adams-Ray (1975–1976)
Pekka Langer (1976)
Alicia Lundberg (1976)
Sven Lindahl (1977)
Pekka Langer (1977)
Gert Landin (1977)
Arne Weise (1978)
Pekka Langer (1978)
Åke Strömmer (1978)
Kent Finell (1979)
Pekka Langer (1979)
Gert Landin (1979)
Kent Finell (1980)
Kersti Adams-Ray (1980)
Kent Finell (1980)
Lasse Lönndahl	(1980–1981)
Janne Önnerud (1981)
Östen Warnerbring (1981)
Eddie Bruhner	(1982 – 13 June 1982)
No shows (20 June 1982 – 6 October 1985)
Jan-Erik Lundén (13 October 1985 – 1986)
Janne Önnerud (1986–1987)
Kent Finell (1987–2002)
Annika Jankell	(2003 – 19 August 2007)
Carolina Norén	(26 August 2007 – present)

See also
Sverigetopplistan, today's official sales-based Swedish record chart

References

External links
Svensktoppen on Sveriges Radio

 
Music chart shows
1962 establishments in Sweden
1962 radio programme debuts
Sveriges Radio programmes